Star Air was an Indonesian airline.

History
The airline was established in 2000, a period in which private companies sprang up in Indonesia after the government announced the deregulation of airlines in the country. However, like some other Indonesian airlines (a total of 11 airlines), Star Air's license was revoked by the government in 2008 due to inactivity.

Destinations
Indonesia
Java and Lesser Sunda Islands
Bali - Ngurah Rai International Airport (Secondary Hub)
Jakarta - Soekarno-Hatta International Airport (Hub)
Kupang - El Tari Airport
Surabaya - Juanda International Airport (Focus City)
Kalimantan
Balikpapan - Sultan Aji Muhammad Sulaiman Airport
Sumatra 
Medan - Polonia Airport
Pekanbaru - Sultan Syarif Kasim II International Airport
Sulawesi 
Manado - Sam Ratulangi Airport

Malaysia
Kuala Lumpur - Kuala Lumpur International Airport

Fleet

The Star Air fleet consisted of the following aircraft:

 4 Boeing 737-200
 2 McDonnell Douglas MD-82
 1 McDonnell Douglas MD-83

Accidents and incidents
On January 23, 2003, A Star Air Boeing 737 touched down 500m past the Soekarno-Hatta International Airport's runway 25L threshold, a little left of the centreline, in an area of heavy rainfall with associated heavy winds. It went off the side of the runway, causing substantial damage to the undercarriage and belly.

References

Defunct airlines of Indonesia
Airlines established in 2000
Airlines disestablished in 2008
Indonesian companies established in 2002
2008 disestablishments in Indonesia